Lucie Armstrong, ( Cobbe; 1851 – 2 May 1907) also known as Lucie Heaton Armstrong, was an English-Irish journalist and writer on etiquette.

Armstrong had her first work—The Ball-Room Guide—published anonymously in 1880; this was followed by stories for children published in Little Folks magazine; these were then collected in book form in 1883 under the title Doll Stories. She published in several journals, magazines and newspapers, often anonymously or under pseudonyms, and published nine books, eight of which were on etiquette.

She was married once, only briefly. Her husband, John Heaton Armstrong, died of gastroenteritis four and a half months after the wedding.

Biography

Armstrong was born Lucie Cobbe in 1851; her parents were Major Charles Henry Cobbe, of the 60th Bengal Native Infantry, and his wife. Charles was a descendant of the Cobbe family, which made Armstrong a second cousin to the women's suffrage campaigner Frances Power Cobbe. Her father had recently retired from the Bengal Army on health grounds after thirty years' service. He died before Armstrong reached the age of twenty, at which point she was an orphan.

A talented musician when she was young, Armstrong studied piano, either at the Royal Conservatory of Music or the Royal Academy of Music. She composed two hymns or anthems, including for the hymn "Oh, for the wings of a dove", which were played at Westminster Abbey. Over practising on the piano led to an impairment in her hands, and she turned to writing for a career. In 1880 she wrote The Ball-Room Guide, which was published anonymously, and soon afterwards had stories published in Cassell's Little Folks magazine for children. Some of the stories were reprinted in her second book, Doll Stories, which was published in 1883 under the name Lucie Cobbe.

In November 1885 she married John Childe Heaton Armstrong at the register office on The Strand; he was a 34-year-old translator and the elder brother of William Heaton-Armstrong, later a Member of Parliament for the Liberal Party. John and Lucie lived near the British Museum, but he died of gastroenteritis four and a half months after the wedding.

In 1893 Armstrong published The Etiquette of Party Giving, in which she not only provided the etiquette of giving a party, but also outlined several types of parties, including "A Clover Tea", "A Cobweb Party", "A Palette Party" and "An Epithet Party". The book was well received by Florence Fenwick-Miller, reviewing for The Illustrated London News, who called Armstrong an "accomplished authoress" who was experienced in writing on etiquette.

Armstrong published six further books on etiquette before her death on 2 May 1907 at the Camberwell House Asylum in South London.

Works

Armstrong is known to have written for, or been published in Lady's Pictorial, The Globe, Womanhood, The Court Journal, The Ludgate Monthly, The Woman's Signal (and its predecessor, Women's Paper Penny), John Bull, Belgravia, London Society, Chapman's Magazine of Fiction, The Sketch, Pall Mall Budget, Hearth and Home and several provincial journals. She published anonymously and under pseudonyms and several variants of her names, including Lucie Cobbe, Lucie Cobbe-Armstrong, Mrs L. Heaton Armstrong, Mrs Armstrong, Mrs Heaton Armstrong, Lucie Heaton Armstrong, Lucie H Armstrong, Lucy H Armstrong, Lucie Cobbe-Armstrong, Zingara, Comme-il-Faut and Aunt Priscilla.

 The Ball-Room Guide (1880)  (Updated in 1900 )
 Doll Stories (1883; as Lucie Cobbe) 
 The Etiquette of Party Giving, etc (1893) 
 Good Form. A Book of Every Day Etiquette (1889) 
 Etiquette for Girls (1893) 
 The Etiquette of Party Giving with Hints to Hostess and Guest (1893) 
 Letters to a Bride, Including Letters to a Débutante (1896) 
 Etiquette-up-to-Date (1898) 
 Etiquette and Entertaining (1903)

References

Sources
 
 
 
 
 
 
 
 

19th-century English non-fiction writers
19th-century British journalists
19th-century British women writers
19th-century British writers
20th-century English non-fiction writers
20th-century British journalists
20th-century British women writers
1851 births
1907 deaths
English women journalists
Women of the Victorian era
Writers from London
19th-century women journalists